Candelario is a municipality located in the province of Salamanca, Castile and León, Spain.

Notable people from Candelario
 Francisco Sánchez-Bayo (scientist)

See also 
 Canchal de la Ceja

References

Municipalities in the Province of Salamanca